Fábio Jr. is a Brazilian singer.

Fábio Júnior may also refer to:

Fábio Júnior Pereira (born 1977), Brazilian footballer
Fábio Júnior Nascimento Santana (born 1983), Brazilian footballer
Fábio Júnior dos Santos (born 1982), Brazilian footballer